The 1953 Small Club World Cup (2nd tournament) was the third edition of the Small Club World Cup, a tournament held in Venezuela between 1952 and 1957, and in 1963 and in 1965. It was played by four participants, half from Europe and half from South America in double round robin format and featured stars like László Kubala, goalkeeper Antoni Ramallets, Estanislau Basora for Barcelona, goalkeeper Gilmar, Baltazar for Corinthians, Egisto Pandolfini and Carlo Galli for Roma. This was the 2nd tournament played in the same year; none was held in the next calendar year.

Corinthians entered to the competition (as champion of 1952 Campeonato Paulista), after Vasco da Gama (1952 Campeonato Carioca champion) declined the invitation. FC Barcelona striker László Kubala was the topscorer of the competition, along with Brazilian midfielder Luizinho, with 5 goals each.

Participants 

Notes

Matches

Final standings

Topscorers

Winners

References

1953-54
1953 in South American football
1953 in Brazilian football
1953–54 in Italian football
1953–54 in Spanish football
1953 in Venezuelan sport